The Munda people are an Austroasiatic speaking ethnic group of the Indian subcontinent. They predominantly speak the Mundari language as their native language, which belongs to the Munda subgroup of Austroasiatic languages. The Munda are found mainly concentrated in the south and East Chhotanagpur Plateau region of Jharkhand, Odisha and West Bengal. The Munda also reside in adjacent areas of Madhya Pradesh as well as in portions of Bangladesh, Nepal, and the state of Tripura. They are one of India's largest scheduled tribes. Munda people in Tripura are also known as Mura.

Etymology 
Munda means headman of village in Munda-Makni system to govern villages in South-east Chotanagpur. They call themselves hodoko or horo means men.
Robert Parkin notes that the term "Munda" did not belong to the Austroasiatic lexis and is of Sanskrit origin. According to R. R. Prasad, the name "Munda" is a Sanskrit word means "headman". It is an honorific name given by Hindus and hence became a tribal name. According to Standing (1976), it was under British rule, the term Munda started to be used for the tribal group.

History

According to linguist Paul Sidwell, Munda languages arrived on the coast of Odisha from Southeast Asia about 4000–3500 years ago. The Munda people initially spread from Southeast Asia, but mixed extensively with local Indian populations. They are genetically closely related to Mah Meri and Temuan people of Malaysia.

According to historian R. S. Sharma, tribals who spoke the Munda language occupied the eastern region of ancient India. Many Munda terms occur in Vedic texts that were written between 1500 BCE and 500 BCE. Their presence in texts compiled in the upper Gangetic basin late in that period suggests that Munda speakers were there at the time. According to Barbara A. West, the Mundas claim origin in Uttar Pradesh, and a steady flow eastward in history as other groups moved into their original homeland; she suggests they inhabited a much larger territory in ancient India. Recent study suggest that Munda languages spread as far as Eastern Uttar Pradesh but not beyond that and impacted Eastern Indo-Aryan languages as some group such as Musahar have munda genetic lineage. The claim of Munda presence in Upper gangetic plain have no linguistic and genetic basis.

In the late 1800s, during the British Raj, the Mundas were forced to pay rents and work as bonded labourers to the zamindars. During Kol uprising in 1823-1833, some Manki Munda revolted due to their disposition and attacked Thikedars, other Mankis, plundered and destroyed villages. This insurgency was suppressed by Thomas Wilkinson. During the 19th century, Munda freedom fighter Birsa Munda began the protest marches calling for non-payment of rents and remission of forest dues. He led guerrilla warfare to uproot British Raj and establish Munda Raj. He caught by Company forces along with his supporters  and died in Jail. He is still revered in Jharkhand.

Nomadic hunters in the India tribal belt, they became farmers and some were employed in basketwork. With the listing of the Munda people as Scheduled Tribes, many are employed in various governmental organisations (particularly Indian Railways).

Kinship patterns
Munda are divided into number of exogamous clans. Clans among Mundas are known as Killi which is similar to Sanskrit word Kula. Munda are patrilineal and clan name descends father to son. According to tradition, people of same clan are descendant of same forefather. Clan among Mundas are of totemic origin. Some clans are:
 Baa (a fish)
 Baba (rice)
 Bodra
 Balamchu (fish net)
 Barla
 Bhengra (horse)
 Bukru
 Bulung (salt)
 Dang, Dungdung (a fish)
 Gudia, Hans (swan)
 Hemrom/Hembram (a tree)
 Herenz (a Specific Bird)
 Horo (turtle)
 Hundar (hyena)
 Jojo (tamarind)
 Kauwa (crow)
 Kerketta (a bird)
 Kula (tiger)
 Nil (bull)
 Mus (mouse)
 Nag (cobra)
 Oreya (Bammboo Basket)
 Pandu (cobra)
 Sandil (a bird)
 Purty
 Runda (wild cat)
 Sanga (a type of root)
 Surin/Soren/Soreng (a bird)
 Tiru (a bird)
 Tuti (a type of grain)
 Topno (red ants)
 Kongari (a rare specie of bird: white crow)

Culture and tradition

Festival
Involved in agriculture, the Munda people celebrate the seasonal festivals of Mage Parab, Phagu, Karam, Baha parab, Sarhul and Sohrai. Some seasonal festivals have coincided with religious festivals, but their original meaning remains. Their deity is singbonga means Sun god.

Music
They have many folk songs, dances, tales and traditional musical instruments. Both sexes participate in dances at social events and festivals. The naqareh is a principal musical instrument. Munda refer to their dance and song as durang and susun respectively. Some folk dances of the Munda are Jadur, Karam Susun and Mage Susun. Mundari music is similar to the music of Sadan. Mundari Mage song (winter) rhythm is similar to the Nagpuri Fagua song (winter, spring) rhythm.

Ritual
The Munda people have elaborate rituals to celebrate birth, death, engagement and marriage.

Munda practice clan exogamy and tribal endogamy. Mongamy in norm. Bride price is prevalent. Marriage ceremoy started with Sagai and end with Bidai. Munda enjoy this occasion with feast, drinks and dance. According to Sarat Chandra Roy, Sindurdaan ceremony and turmaric use in marriage clearly reflect hindu elements borrowed in munda tradition.

Munda people of Jharkhand also follow the old age tradition of Patthalgari i.e. stone erection in which the tribal community residing in the village buries a large inverted U-shaped dressed headstone on the head side of grave or entrance of village in which is inscribed the family tree of the dead persons. There are some other types of patthalgari also:-
Horadiri - It is the stone in which family tree is written.
Chalpadiri or Saasandiri - It is the stone in remarking boundary of any village and its limits.
Magodiri - This is the headstone of a social criminal who committed polygamy or unsocial marriage.
Ziddiri - This is the stone placed over burial of placenta and dried naval part of a newborn.

Administrative system
Munda-Makni governing system was prevalent in Kolhan region of Jharkhand.
Munda govern their villages by Munda-Makni system. Head of village is called Munda, The informant of village is called Dakuwa, village priest called is Deori, assistant of Deori is called Yatra Deori, head of 15 to 20 villages is called Manki, assistant of Manki is called Tahshildar which collected taxes. The priest "Deori" is also prevalent among Hos, Bhumij, Bhuyan, Sounti, Khonds tribe of Odisha and Chutia people of Assam. In Chotanagpur division, Munda have adopted Pahan as their village priest.

Economic condition 
In a 2016 research paper on subsistence strategies of Mundas in a village of Sunderbans in West Bengal, it was found that many people migrate out of their residences because of poor economic conditions and landlessness. This rural to urban migration has followed a greater trend within India. Men and women engage in forest product collection, cultivation, small business and agricultural as well as non-agricultural jobs. A person or a family may be engaged in multiple occupations, often undertaking risky visits to the forests and rivers. It was also found that younger generation preferred to engage as migrant workers outside the village and often outside the district and the state.

Literature and studies

Jesuit priest John-Baptist Hoffmann (1857–1928) studied the language, customs, religion and life of the Munda people, publishing the first Mundari language grammar in 1903. With the help of Menas Orea, Hoffmann published the 15-volume Encyclopaedia Mundarica. The first edition was published posthumously in 1937, and a third edition was published in 1976. The Mundas and Their Country, by S. C. Roy, was published in 1912. Adidharam (Hindi:आदि धर्म) by Ram Dayal Munda and Ratan Singh Manki, in Mundari with a Hindi translation, describes Munda rituals and customs.

Genetics
According to genetic study on the Indian population in 2007, Mundari speaking people of East India carry around 55% Haplogroup O, 25.4% halpogroup H, 4.9% Haplogroup R2, 4.4% Haplogroup J and  3.3% Haplogroup F.

Notable Mundas

 Dayamani Barla (active 2004–2013), journalist
 Puna Bhengra, Politician
 Niral Enem Horo, Politician
 Amrit Lugun (born 1962), Ambassador to Greece, South Asian Association for Regional Cooperation director
 Anuj Lugun (born 1986), poet who received the 2011 Bharat Bhushan Agarwal Award
Munmun Lugun, football player
 Arjun Munda (born 1968), politician
 Birsa Munda (1875-1900), freedom fighter, religious leader
 Jaipal Singh Munda (1903-1970), politician, hockey player
 Joseph Munda, Politician
 Kariya Munda (born 1936), politician
 Laxman Munda, politician
 Nilkanth Singh Munda (born 1968), politician
 Ram Dayal Munda (1939-2011), scholar in languages & folklore
 Sukra Munda (active 2016 to 2020), politician
 Tulasi Munda (born 1947), social activist
 Rohidas Singh Nag (1934-2012), creator of "Mundari Bani" script
Masira Surin, hockey player
Rajeev Topno (born 1974), Private Secretary to the prime minister of India, Senior Advisor to the Executive Director at World Bank

See also
 Christianity in Jharkhand
 Korku people
 Munda peoples
 Kolarian

Notes

References

Further reading
 Parkin, R. (1992). The Munda of central India: an account of their social organisation. Delhi: Oxford University Press. 
 Omkar, P.(2018). "Santhal tribes present in India" like Jharkhand, Odisha, and West Bengal... Belavadi.
 Omkar, patil.(2018). "Kola tribes"...

External links

 Sarna – A case study in religion On the religion of the Munda tribals
 Sinlung – Indian tribes
  This article is a discussion of the related family of languages.
 RWAAI | RWAAI, Lunds universitet RWAAI (Repository and Workspace for Austroasiatic Intangible Heritage)
 http://hdl.handle.net/10050/00-0000-0000-0003-A6AA-C@view Mundari language in RWAAI Digital Archive

 
Ethnic groups in Bangladesh
Ethnic groups in India
Ethnic groups in South Asia
Ethnoreligious groups in Asia
Scheduled Tribes of India
Scheduled Tribes of Odisha
Social groups of Bihar
Social groups of Jharkhand
Social groups of Odisha
Social groups of West Bengal
Sociology of religion
Tribes of Jharkhand
Tribes of West Bengal
Ethnic groups in Nepal